R (Tigere) v Secretary of State for Business, Innovation and Skills was a 2015 judgment of the Supreme Court of the United Kingdom concerning student loans in the United Kingdom.

Facts
Beaurish Tigere arrived in the UK from Zambia at the age of six. She came as a dependent of her father who had a student visa. The father left in 2003 but Tigere remained with her mother who over-stayed. The UK Border Agency became aware of this situation in 2010 and granted them temporary permission to remain which became discretionary leave to remain in 2012. Tigere would have been entitled to apply for indefinite leave to remain in 2018 but until that time she was unable to apply for a student loan despite achieving three A-Levels and a place at Northumbria University to study International Business Management.

The case was brought on behalf of Tigere by Public Interest Lawyers who argued that the policy was an infringement of Tigere's right to education under Article 2 of the First Protocol of the European Convention on Human Rights. This provision reads "[n]o person shall be denied the right to education" and the negative formulation does mean that there is no automatic entitlement to public support. However Tigere argued that this ought to be read in line with Article 14 of the Convention that states her rights "shall be secured without discrimination on any ground" (in this case her immigration status).

Judgment

High Court
The High Court found in favour of Tigere and held that the blanket ban on her eligibility for a student loan based on her immigration status was a disproportionate interference on her right to education and also constituted discrimination under Article 14.

Court of Appeal
The Secretary of State appealed the decision to the Court of Appeal which held that the case concerned an area of "national strategic policy for the distribution of scarce resources in a field of great social importance" and therefore a wide margin of appreciation should be afforded to government policy. With this in mind the appeal was allowed.

Supreme Court
The Supreme Court allowed Ms. Tigere's appeal by a majority of three to two. Lady Hale (with whom Lord Kerr agreed) gave the leading judgment and concluded:

Lord Hughes offered a concurring judgment but slightly disagreed with Lady Hale by suggesting that any future rules drawn up by the Secretary of State would not necessarily have to include an 'exceptional case' discretion. In particular he noted:

The joint minority judgment handed down by Lords Reed and Sumption argued that the appropriate test is whether the scheme is 'manifestly without foundation' and concluded that:

Impact
Solicitor Paul Heron, of Public Interest Lawyers, said:

The Coram Children’s Legal Centre provided evidence for the hearing. Their solicitor, Alison East, said:

Just for Kids Law intervened in the case and estimated that between 600-1,000 students were affected by the restrictions each year. Their director Shauneen Lambe responded to the judgment by saying:

The Daily Express noted that the judgment came "as figures revealed that students from the European Union have dodged paying back £43million in taxpayer-funded loans."

See also
Department of Business, Innovation and Skills
Student loans in the United Kingdom
Right to education
European Convention on Human Rights
2015 Judgments of the Supreme Court of the United Kingdom

References

External links
Supreme Court judgment
Video of the judgment

Supreme Court of the United Kingdom cases
2015 in British law
2015 in case law
Education finance in the United Kingdom
United Kingdom–Zambia relations
United Kingdom immigration case law
Article 2 of Protocol No. 1 of the European Convention on Human Rights
Article 14 of the European Convention on Human Rights
Northumbria University
Student rights case law
Department for Business, Innovation and Skills